Louder Than Words or Louder than Words may refer to:

Louder Than Words (album), a 1996 album by Lionel Richie
Louder Than Words (EP), an EP by Kate Voegele
"Louder than Words" (Pink Floyd song)
"Louder than Words" (David Guetta and Afrojack song)
Louder Than Words (film), a 2013 film starring David Duchovny
Louder than Words, distributor of the 9/11 conspiracy theory film series Loose Change

See also
Louder than Words: A Mother's Journey in Healing Autism, an autobiographical book by Jenny McCarthy
Music Speaks Louder Than Words, a 1990 album released by Epic Records
Mackin Speaks Louder Than Words, a 2002 album by Mac Mall